Coffee Creek is a stream in Morgan County in the U.S. state of Missouri. It is a tributary of Little Gravois Creek and the Gravois arm of the Lake of the Ozarks.

Coffee Creek was named due to its dark waters resembling the color of coffee.

See also
List of rivers of Missouri

References

Rivers of Morgan County, Missouri
Rivers of Missouri